DDP 4 Life is the debut album from Dublin Death Patrol, a thrash metal band formed by Testament vocalist Chuck Billy and Exodus vocalist Steve "Zetro" Souza and released on April 13, 2007.

Track listing
R.I.P. – 2:43
Unnatural Causes – 3:06
Mentally Unstable – 3:49
Pigs in the Hollow – 4:00
DDP for Life – 4:31
Sid Vicious – 2:59
Iron Fist – 2:56 (Motörhead cover)
Cold Sweat – 3:11 (Thin Lizzy cover)
Lights Out – 4:20 (UFO cover)
Trail of the Executioner – 5:13
Devil in Disguise – 4:09
Corruption / Central Pomo Indian Songs – 12:08

Personnel
Chuck Billy - Vocals
Steve Souza - Vocals
Andy Billy - Guitar
Greg Bustamante - Rhythm & Lead Guitar
Steve Robello - Rhythm & Lead Guitar
Phil Demmel - Guitar
Willy Lange - Bass
Eddie Billy - Bass
John Souza - Bass
Danny Cunningham - Drums
Troy Luccketta - Drums
John Hartsinck - Guitar

Production
Produced By Chuck Billy (also executive producer) & Vincent Wojno
Recorded & Engineered By Alan Lucchesi & Vincent Wojno
Mixed By Vincent Wojno
Mastered By Eddy Schreyer

2007 debut albums
Dublin Death Patrol albums